Cape May is the southernmost point of the U.S. state of New Jersey, at the entrance to Delaware Bay.

Cape May may also refer to:

Cape May, New Jersey, a city in New Jersey
Cape May (Antarctica), a headland in McMurdo Sound, Antarctica
 USS Cape May (ID-3520), a United States Navy cargo ship and troop transport
 SS Cape May (T-AKR-5063), Heavy Lift Ship of Military Sealift Command's Sealift Program Office
The Cape May, a Canadian rock band

See also
Cape May County, New Jersey
Cape May Court House, New Jersey, a census-designated place
Cape May Point, New Jersey, a borough
Cape May Seashore Lines, a short line railroad
Cape May warbler, Dendroica tigrina, a small bird
Cape May County Park and Zoo, a park and zoo in Cape May Court House, New Jersey